This is a list of for-profit institutions of higher education.

In the United States

 Academy of Art University – San Francisco, California
 American Career College – Los Angeles, California
 American InterContinental University – more than 90% online, a subsidiary of Perdoceo
 American National University – distance education and multiple locations in Virginia, Ohio, Kentucky, Indiana, and West Virginia; not to be confused with American University or National American University
 American Public University – online, a division of American Public University System; not to be confused with American University
 Antonelli College – multiple locations
 Art Institutes – most campuses were closed in 2018
 ASA College – campuses in Brooklyn, midtown Manhattan, and Miami
 Aspen University – Denver, Colorado
 Bay State College – Boston, Massachusetts, owned by Ambow Education
 Berkeley College – New York and New Jersey; not to be confused with University of California, Berkeley, Berklee College of Music, or the Berkeley College at Yale University
 Blue Cliff College – a subsidiary of Quad Partners
 Broadview University – Utah
 Brookline College – a division of Linden Education Group
 Bryant & Stratton College – multiple locations. The school is in the process of converting to nonprofit.
 Burrell College of Osteopathic Medicine – Las Cruces, New Mexico
 California Miramar University – San Diego, California (formerly known as Pacific Western University)
 California Northstate University College of Medicine – Elk Grove, California
 Capella University – Minneapolis, Minnesota and online
 Carrington College – 17 locations in the United States
 Chamberlain College of Nursing – a subsidiary of Adtalem
 Charleston School of Law – Charleston, South Carolina
 Charter College – campuses in Alaska, California, and Washington
 The College of Westchester – White Plains, New York not to be confused with West Chester University in West Chester, Pennsylvania
 Colorado Technical University – more than 90% online, a subsidiary of Career Education Corporation
 Columbia Southern University – not to be confused with Columbia University
 Conservatory of Recording Arts and Sciences – Tempe, Arizona
 Daymar College – multiple campuses in Tennessee, Kentucky and Ohio, and online
 DeVry University – multiple locations, subsidiaries include  Keller School of Management (several campuses have closed)
 DigiPen Institute of Technology – Redmond, Washington
 Eagle Gate College – Utah
 ECPI University – formerly ECPI College of Technology; multiple locations; includes Medical Careers Institute multiple locations in Virginia
 Engine City Technical Institute – South Plainfield, New Jersey – now Lincoln Technical Institute
 Fashion Institute of Design & Merchandising – FIDM (four locations in California) not to be confused with Fashion Institute of Technology, a state university in New York City
 Five Towns College – Dix Hills, New York
 Florida Career College – multiple locations, owned by International Education Corporation
 Florida Coastal School of Law – Jacksonville, FL. Subsidiary of InfiLaw System
 Florida Metropolitan University – multiple locations, now Everest University
 Florida National University – Hialeah, Florida
 Fortis College – multiple locations
 Fox College – Chicago metropolitan area (Bedford Park and Tinley Park)
 Full Sail University – Winter Park, Florida
 Georgia Medical Institute – multiple locations, not to be confused with the Medical College of Georgia at Augusta University, now Everest Institute
 Grand Canyon University – online and Phoenix, Arizona
 Hamilton College – Iowa; now part of Kaplan University; formerly operated from multiple locations in Iowa and Nebraska; not to be confused with Hamilton College in Clinton, New York, or with the unaccredited Hamilton University, now Kaplan University
 Idaho College of Osteopathic Medicine – Meridian, Idaho
 International Education Corporation operates US Colleges, Florida Career Colleges, United Education Institute and UEI Colleges
 Lincoln Tech – multiple locations; not to be confused with Lincoln University
 Los Angeles Film School – Los Angeles, California
 McCann School of Business and Technology – multiple locations
 Miami International University of Art and Design
 Mildred Elley – multiple locations
 Miller-Motte – multiple locations
 Monroe College – multiple locations
 Mountain West College – Salt Lake City, Utah
 National American University – primarily online. Not to be confused with American University
 National College – multiple U.S. locations
 National Institute of Technology (United States) – now Everest Institute – multiple locations; not to be confused with National Institutes of Technology in India
 National Paralegal College – Phoenix, Arizona
 National University College – multiple locations, Puerto Rico
 Neumont University – multiple locations
 NewSchool of Architecture and Design – San Diego, California; owned by Ambow Education. Not to be confused with The New School
 Northwestern College – Chicago, Illinois; not to be confused with Northwestern University
 Ohio Business College – multiple locations
 Olympia Career Training Institute – multiple locations, now Everest College
 Pacific College of Oriental Medicine – a subsidiary of Quad Partners
 Post University – Waterbury, Connecticut
 Parks College – multiple locations
 Paier College of Art – Hamden, Connecticut
 Pennco Tech – multiple locations
 Pima Medical Institute – multiple locations
 Pinnacle Career Institute – Kansas, multiple locations
 Pioneer Pacific College – multiple locations in Oregon
 Platt College – Southern California multiple locations, Anaheim, Riverside, Ontario, Alhambra, San Diego, Colorado
 Plaza College – Forest Hills, New York
 Porter and Chester Institute – Connecticut, Massachusetts
 Post University – Connecticut, not to be confused with LIU Post
 Potomac College – Washington, D.C. area, now the University of the Potomac
 Provo College – Provo, Utah
 Rasmussen College – multiple locations, now owned by American Public University System.
 Rocky Mountain College of Art and Design, Lakewood, Colorado
 Rocky Mountain University of Health Professions – Utah
 Rocky Vista University College of Osteopathic Medicine – Parker, Colorado
 SAE Institute – formerly the School of Audio Engineering
 Salem International University – Salem, West Virginia
 San Joaquin Valley College – California, multiple locations
 Schiller International University – multiple locations
 School of Visual Arts – New York City
 Seacoast Career Schools
 South College – Knoxville, Tennessee; not to be confused with Southern University or the University of the South.
 South University – multiple locations; owned by Education Principle Foundation (EPF); not to be confused with Southern University or the University of the South.
 Southern Careers Institute – Texas, multiple locations; not to be confused with Southern University or the University of the South.
 Southern States University – California; not to be confused with Southern University or the University of the South.
 Southwestern College – multiple locations; not to be confused with Southwestern University or Lincoln University
 Spartan College of Aeronautics and Technology – Tulsa, Oklahoma
 Specs Howard School of Media Arts – Michigan
 Strayer University – multiple locations
 Sullivan University – Kentucky, multiple locations
 Suncoast College of Health – Bradenton, Florida; Brandon, Florida
 UEI College – multiple campuses in California
 United States University; not to be confused with American University
 Universal Technical Institute – campuses in Arizona, California, Florida, Massachusetts, North Carolina, Pennsylvania, and Texas
 University of Advancing Technology – Tempe, Arizona
 University of Phoenix – multiple locations (more than 400 campuses and learning site have closed)
 University of the Potomac – Washington DC; Vienna, Virginia; online- a division of Linden Education
 Waldorf College – Forrest City, Iowa
 Washington Technology University – Bellevue, Washington
 West Coast University – Los Angeles, California
 Western Business College – multiple locations, now Everest College
 Western International University – multiple locations, a subsidiary of Apollo Group
 Western State College of Law – Irvine, California; not to be confused with Western Governors University
 Western State University College of Law – Fullerton, California; not to be confused with Western Governors University
 Wyoming Technical Institute (WyoTech) – As of 2018, the school has only one campus (under new ownership)

Distance education (online)
 American College of Technology – online distance education, based in St. Joseph, Missouri; not to be confused with American University 
 American College of Education – online; not to be confused with American University 
 American Military University – online, a division of American Public University System; not to be confused with American University or United States Military Academy
 American Public University System – includes the American Military University and American Public University; distance education; offices in Charles Town, West Virginia, and Manassas, Virginia; not to be confused with American University 
 American Sentinel University – distance education, based in Denver, Colorado
 Ashworth College – online, based in Norcross, Georgia
 Aspen University – online, based in Denver, Colorado
 California InterContinental University – online, based in Diamond Bar, California
 California Southern University – online; not to be confused with The University of Southern California
 Capella University – online
 London School of Business and Finance – online; not to be confused with London School of Economics or London Business School 
 New Charter University – formerly Andrew Jackson University; distance education; based in Hoover, Alabama
 New England College of Business and Finance; not to be confused with New England College
 Setanta College – online
 Trident University International – formerly TUI University, formerly Touro University International; online; not to be confused with Trident Technical College
 University of Atlanta – distance education only; not to be confused with Atlanta University Center or Clark Atlanta University
 University of Liverpool – distance education only, a division of Laureate Education
 University of the Potomac – distance education offices in Washington, D.C., and Vienna, Virginia with remote administration offices as well
 U.S. Career Institute – Fort Collins, Colorado
 Walden University – online, a division of Adtalem Education

Outside the United States
 Adamson University - Manila, Philippines
AMA Education System - multiple locations in the Philippines and Bahrain
 Anhembi Morumbi University – São Paulo, Brazil
 Arden University – United Kingdom (part of Global University Systems group).
Arellano University - multiple locations in Metro Manila, Philippines
Baliaug University - Bulacan, Philippines 
 BPP University – United Kingdom (part of Apollo Education Group).
Central Colleges of the Philippines - Quezon City, Philippines
 Centro Escolar University - Manila, Makati and Las Pinas, Philippines
 Cyprus College – Nicosia, Cyprus
 Dnyaneshwar Vidyapeeth – India
Emilio Aguinaldo College - Manila and Cavite, Philippines
FEATI University - Manila, Philippines 
FEU Group of Schools - Metro Manila and Cavite, Philippines
Jose Rizal University - Mandaluyong, Philippines 
 Laureate International Universities – Peru and Mexico
 London School of Business and Finance – United Kingdom (part of Global University Systems group). not to be confused with London School of Economics or London Business School
Lyceum of the Philippines University - multiple locations in the Philippines 
iPeople Inc.
 Malayan Colleges Laguna - Laguna, Philippines 
 Mapua University - Manila, Philippines
National Teachers College - Manila, Philippines
University of Nueva Caceres - Camarines Sur, Philippines
Manuel S. Enverga University - Quezon, Philippines 
 Multimedia University – multiple locations in Malaysia
 National University (Philippines) - multiple locations in the Philippines
 Nyenrode Business University – Breukelen, Netherlands
Our Lady of Fatima University - multiple locations in the Philippines 
Philippine Women's University - Manila, Philippines  
 PHINMA Education Network
 Saint Jude College - Manila, Philippines 
 Araullo University - Cabanatuan, Philippines
 Cagayan de Oro College - Cagayan de Oro, Philippines
 University of Iloilo - Iloilo City, Philippines
 University of Pangasinan - Dagupan, Philippines
 Southwestern University - Cebu City, Philippines
 Rai University – India
 Regenesys Business School – Sandton, South Africa
 Ross University – Ross University School of Medicine in Picard, Dominica; Ross University School of Veterinary Medicine in Saint Kitts
 Sigmund Freud University Vienna - Vienna, Austria
 St. George's University – Grenada; includes medical school, school of veterinary medicine, and other programs
 STI College - multiple locations in the Philippines
iAcademy - Makati, Philippines
 St Patrick's College, London – United Kingdom (part of Global University Systems group).
 Taylor's University – multiple locations in Malaysia
Technological Institute of the Philippines - Manila and Quezon City, Philippines
 Trinity School of Medicine - St. Vincent and Grenadines
Universidad de Zamboanga - Zamboanga, Philippines 
 Universidad Europea de Madrid – Madrid, Spain
University of the East - Manila, Philippines
 University of Medicine and Health Sciences - Basseterre, Saint Kitts, Caribbean
University of Baguio - Baguio, Philippines 
 University of Law – United Kingdom (part of Global University Systems group). 
University of Mindanao - multiple locations in Mindanao, Philippines 
University of Perpetual Help System - multiple locations in the Philippines

In India many educational trusts and institutions which have no accreditation give autonomous degrees for profit.

In Chile many universities are suspected of violating legislation that forbids profitmaking in such institutions.

Closed or merged
 Allied American University – Laguna Hills, California, closed 2016
 Altierus Career College-formerly part of Corinthian Colleges, last campuses closed in 2022. 
 Anthem Institute – formerly the Chubb Institute; multiple locations, closed 2014
 American Sentinel University – merged with Post University in March 2021, becoming the American Sentinel College of Nursing & Health Sciences.  
 Arizona Summit Law School – a subsidiary of InfiLaw System
 Argosy University closed 2019
 Ashmead College – multiple locations, closed
 ATI Enterprises – campuses in Arizona, Florida, and Texas, closed
 Banner College – Arlington, Virginia, closed
 Banner Institute – Chicago, closed
 Bethany University - Scotts Valley, CA
 Blair College – Colorado Springs, Colorado – Acquired by Everest College,which closed in 2015. 
 Branford Hall Career Institute- multiple campuses, closed 2020
 Bradford School (Columbus) – Columbus, Ohio; closed 2020
 Bradford School (Pittsburgh) – Pittsburgh, Pennsylvania; closed 2019
 Briarcliffe College – Long Island, New York; a subsidiary of Career Education Corporation; closed 2016
 Brightwood College closed in 2018 
 Brooks Institute of Photography – multiple locations, closed in 2016
 Brown Mackie College – multiple locations, a subsidiary of Education Management Corporation, closed in 2017
 Bryman College – multiple locations; not to be confused with The Bryman School in Arizona, closed in 2014
 Collins College – Phoenix, Arizona area
 Charlotte School of Law – subsidiary of InfiLaw System
 Corinthian Colleges
 Le Cordon Bleu – multiple locations, subsidiary of Career Education Corporation; closed 2017
 Crown College – Tacoma, Washington; lost accreditation in 2007 and closed
 Daniel Webster College – Nashua, New Hampshire, subsidiary of ITT Educational Services, closed 2017
 Decker College – 2002
 Eagle Gate College – Utah; closed 2015
 Everest College – multiple locations, a subsidiary of Corinthian Colleges, closed 2015
 Everest Institute – multiple locations, a subsidiary of Corinthian Colleges, closed 2015
 FastTrain College – Florida, closed in 2014 after FBI raid
 Gibbs College – multiple locations; closed 2009
 Grantham University – merged into University of Arkansas System, 2021 
 Harrington College of Design – a subsidiary of Career Education Corporation; closed 2016
 Harris School of Business- multiple campuses, closed 2020
 Harrison College – Indiana; multiple locations; closed 2018
 Heald College – multiple locations, a subsidiary of Corinthian Colleges; closed 2015
 High-Tech Institute – multiple locations, closed
 Independence University converted into a non-profit in 2012, closed 2021.  
 International Academy of Design and Technology – multiple locations – consolidated with Sanford-Brown, then closed
 ITT Technical Institute – all locations (closed September 6, 2016)
 Kee Business College – multiple locations in Virginia, subsidiary of Corinthian Colleges, Inc.
 King's College – Charlotte, North Carolina (closed December 2018)
 Las Vegas College – locations in Nevada and Texas, became Everest College in 2009
 Miami-Jacobs Career College – closed 2016
 Minneapolis Business College – Roseville, Minnesota, closed 2019
 Missouri College – a subsidiary of Career Education Corporation, closed 2016
 Mount Washington College – multiple locations in New Hampshire, closed 2016
 McNally Smith College of Music – Saint Paul, Minnesota
 Redstone College – multiple locations in Colorado, a division of Alta Colleges, Spartan College of Aeronautics and Technology purchased the Broomfield Campus in April 2016
 Sanford-Brown College – multiple locations; subsidiary of Career Education Corporation; not to be confused with either Stanford University or Samford University;closed 2016
 Salter College – closed 2019
 Spencerian College – Kentucky, multiple locations; merged into Sullivan University in 2018
 Springfield College – Springfield, Missouri; not to be confused with Springfield College in Springfield, Massachusetts, changed name to Everest College, closed in 2015
 Stratford University – closed 2022. 
 Trump University – New York City, New York; closed 2010
 University of the Rockies – Colorado Springs, Colorado, a subsidiary of Zovio (formerly called Bridgepoint Education) merged with Ashford University.
 Vatterott College – multiple locations – closed 2018
 Victory University – Memphis, Tennessee; closed in 2014
 Virginia College – multiple locations, not to be confused with the University of Virginia closed in 2018
 Vista College-locations in Texas, New Mexico, and Arkansas; closed 2021 
 Westwood College – multiple locations; closed 2016
 Wood Tobé-Coburn School – New York City, New York; closed 2017
 Wright Career College, converted to non-profit in 1995, closed in 2016.

For-profit colleges that became non-profit colleges
Conversions from for-profit to nonprofit are legitimate when the assets and income are fully committed to the educational purpose, and control by private interests is eliminated. Some converted nonprofits may not be legitimate. A Government Accountability Office report about the problem is anticipated.
 Art Institutes (converted in 2017)
 Ashford University became non-profit in 2018 and was subsequently acquired by the University of Arizona in 2020. 
 Baker College in Michigan became nonprofit in 1977.
 Community Care College and its affiliated institutions (Clary Sage College and Oklahoma Technical College) converted to nonprofit in 2015.
 Concord Law School – online, part of Purdue University Global.
 Herzing University converted to nonprofit in 2015.  
 Hult International Business School - Converted to nonprofit in 2014.
 Keiser University (converted in 2011). After the conversion the school owner remained involved in the school as a landlord, contractor, and chancellor.
 Kendall College – Chicago, Illinois, formerly owned by Laureate Education, purchased by National Louis University in 2018.
 Pittsburgh Technical College was an employee-owned for-profit school before becoming nonprofit in 2017.
 Purdue University Global- formerly Kaplan University (converted in 2018, granted IRS tax-exempt status in 2019). Under a long-term contract, the former owner continues to manage much of its operation, causing critics to question the college's integrity as a nonprofit.
 Remington Colleges claimed nonprofit status in 2010.
 South University converted in 2017, but that purchase collapsed and ownership changed. The accreditor lists the school as for-profit as of December 2020.
 Southern New Hampshire University (converted in 1968)
 Stevens-Henager College and its affiliates Independence University, CollegeAmerica, and California College San Diego were purchased by a tax-exempt organization in 2012. Nonprofit status was initially declined by the U.S. Department of Education and then granted in 2018.
 Sunstate Academy was purchased by the family-run Compass-Rose Foundation in 2003.
 Ultimate Medical Academy switched from nonprofit to for-profit in 2005, and then converted back in 2015.

Closed or merged

See also
 Student loan debt
 List of universities and colleges by country
 For-profit higher education in the United States

References